WBC Lokomotiv Sofia are a Bulgarian women's basketball club based in the capital Sofia and part of the Lokomotiv Sofia sports club.

In 1971–72 FIBA Women's European Cup Winners' Cup Lokomotiv lose at semifinal of Ronchetti Cup.

Honours
  Bulgarian Championships: (7) 1948,1949,1950,1951,1952,1967,1991
   Bulgarian Cup:(4) 1951,1954,1965,1968

See also
 BC Lokomotiv Sofia

External links
 WBC Lokomotiv Sofia at eurobasket.com
 News for BC Lokomotiv Sofia in Bulgarian at lokosf.info

Lokomotiv Sofia
Lokomotiv Sofia
Sport in Sofia